Dub Store Records is a Japanese reggae record label specializing in Jamaican music reissues. The label is also known as Studio One Japanese official agency.

Discography

2004
DSR-CD/LP-501 - Ernest Ranglin - Guitar In Ernest - Federal Records

2005
DSR-CD/LP-502 - Count Owen & His Calypsonians - Calypsos Down Jamaica Way - Federal Records
PK10 - Family Man Barrett - Soul Constitution - PK Records UK

2007
DSR-7-01 - Kiddus I - Graduation In Zion - Shepherd
DSR-12-01 - Kiddus I - Security In The Streets / Too Fat - Shepherd
DSR-CD/LP-001 - Kiddus I - Rockers: Graduation In Zion 1978-1980 - Shepherd
DSR-CS7-01 - Jennifer Lara - Misty - Studio One
DSR-CS7-02 - Jennifer Lara - Woman Of The Ghetto - Studio One
DSR-CD/LP-503 - Various - Jamaican Skarama - Federal Records

2009
DSR-7-02 - Glen Brown - No More Slavery / South East Rock - Dwyer Records
DSR-7-03 - Glen Brown - Forward The Good / A Way With The Bad - South East Music
DSR-NL7-001 - Bunny Wailer and The Wailing Wailers - Tread Along / Version - Wail N Soul M
DSR-NL7-002 - Bob Marley and The Wailing Wailers - Feel Alright / Rhythm - Wail N Soul M
DSR-NL7-003 - Bunny Wailer - Searching For Love / Tuff Gong All Stars - Must Skank - Solomonic
DSR-NL7-004 - Bunny Wailer - Bide Up / Bunny Wailer & Big Youth - Bide - Solomonic
DSR-NL7-006 - Solomonic Reggae Star Peter Tosh - Anti-Apartheid / Solomonic Reggae Star - Solidarity - Solomonic
DSR-NL7-007 - Bunny Wailer - Rule Dancehall / Version - Solomonic
DSR-NL12-001 - Bunny Wailer - Rise & Shine / Solomonic Dub - Solomonic
DSR-NL12-002 - Bunny Wailer - Amagideon / Amagideon Dub - Solomonic

2010
DSR-LJ-001 - Dennis Brown - The Exit - Jammys
DSR-LJ-002 - Wayne Smith - My Lord My God - Jammys
DSR-LJ-003 - Wayne Smith - Icky All Over - Jammys
DSR-LJ-004 - Tonto Irie - Life Story - Jammys
DSR-LJ-005 - Wayne Smith - E20 / In Thing - Jammys
DSR-LJ-006 - Robert Lee - Come Now - Jammys
DSR-LJ-007 - Johnny Osbourne - What A La La (In The Area) - Jammys
DSR-LJ-008 - Nitty Gritty - Good Morning Teacher - Jammys
DSR-LJ-009 - Junior Murvin - Jack Slick / Anthony Johnson - Dancehall Vibes - Jammys
DSR-LJ-010 - Red Dragon - Jam Down Posse - Jammys
DSR-LJ-011 - Robert Lee, Bunny General - Midnight Hour - Jammys
DSR-LJ-012 - Little Kirk - Don't Touch The Crack - Jammys
DSR-LJ-013 - Eccleton Jarrett - Rock Them One By One - Jammys
DSR-LJ-014 - Chuck Turner - We Rule Dancehall - Jammys
DSR-LJ-015 - Horace Andy - Love Light Of Mine / Frankie Paul - Ready For Your Loving - Jammys
DSR-LJ-016 - Tonto Irie - General A General - Jammys
DSR-LJ-017 - Johnny Osbourne - Rock It Tonight - Jammys
DSR-LJ-018 - Chaka Demus - Original Kuff - Jammys
DSR-LJ-019 - Robert Lee - Love Me Stylee - Jammys
DSR-LJ-020 - Leslie Thunder - Ram Dance Man - Jammys
DSR-OR7-001 - Anthony Redrose - Me No Want No Boops / King Tubbys All Stars - Version - Firehouse
DSR-OR7-002 - John Wayne - Love It A Kill Me / Rhythm track by Firehouse Crew - Version - Firehouse
DSR-OR7-003 - Super Black - Rising Star / Rhythm track by Firehouse Crew - Version - Firehouse
DSR-OR7-004 - Johnny Osbourne - Line Up / Trevor Levy - Nah Run From No Clash - Firehouse
DSR-NL7-008 - Wailers - Life Line / Big Youth - Black On Black - Solomonic
DSR-NL7-009 - Wailers - Arabs Oil Weapon / Dubd Version - Solomonic
DSR-NL7-010 - Wailers - Pass It On / Trod On - Solomonic
DSR-NL7-011 - Bob Marley And The Wailers - This Train(Wail N Soul M) / Wailers - Reincarnated Souls - Solomonic
DSR-RM7-001 - Puddy Roots - When I Release - Redman
DSR-RM7-002 - Wayne Palmer - Yu Nu Remember - Redman
DSR-RM7-003 - Horace Martin - Geow Now - Redman
DSR-RM7-004 - Admiral Tibet - New Tactics - Redman
DSR-RM7-005 - Carl Meeks - Danger - Redman
DSR-RM7-006 - Dave Bailey - Concrete Jungle - Redman
DSR-RM7-007 - Dave Bailey - Runnings - Redman
DSR-RM7-008 - Da Da Waps - Old Chain - Redman
DSR-RM7-009 - Tony Tuff - Careless People - Redman
DSR-RM7-010 - Carl Meeks - Without Your Love / Red Eye Lover - Redman
DSR-RM7-011 - Little John - Rub A Dub One - Redman

2011
DSR-LJ7-021 - Prince Junior - Crucial Boy - Jammys
DSR-LJ7-022 - Conroy Smith - Love Affair - Jammys
DSR-LJ7-023 - Wayne Smith - Like A Dragon / Dennis Brown - History - Jammys
DSR-LJ7-024 - Half Pint - One Big Ghetto / Tonto Irie - Ram Up Every Corner - Jammys
DSR-LJ7-025 - Robert Lee - Dreams - Jammys
DSR-LJ7-026 - Nitty Gritty - Butter Bread - Jammys
DSR-LJ7-027 - Banana Man - Musical Murder - Jammys
DSR-LJ7-028 - Junior Delgado - Run Come / King Kong - Can't Ride Computer - Jammys
DSR-LJ7-029 - Johnny Osbourne - Chain Robbery - Jammys
DSR-LJ7-030 - Wayne Smith - My Sweet Love - Jammys
DSR-LJ7-031 - Super Black - One Time Girlfriend - Jammys
DSR-LJ7-032 - Pad Anthony - Murderer - Jammys
DSR-LJ7-033 - Josey Wales - Water Come A Mi Eye / Admiral Bailey - Mi Ah The Danger - Jammys
DSR-LJ7-034 - Echo Minott - I Am Back - Jammys
DSR-LJ7-035 - Admiral Tibet - Running From Reality - Jammys
DSR-LJ7-036 - Gregory Isaacs - The Ruler - Jammys
DSR-LJ7-037 - Pad Anthony - Dangerous System - Jammys
DSR-LJ7-038 - Sugar Minott - Conscious Lover / Pad Anthony - By Show Down - Jammys
DSR-LJ7-039 - Conroy Smith - Sugar Me - Jammys
DSR-LJ7-040 - Little John - Come Do It To Me - Jammys
DSR-KI7-02 - Kiddus I - Crying Wolf - Shepherd
DSR-7-04 - Little John and Popsie - Ram Jam / 51 Storm - Youth In Progress
DSR-CD/LP-504 - Gladstone Anderson, Lynn Taitt & The Jets - Glad Sounds - Merritone
DSR-KK7-001 - Ernest Ranglin & Selected Group - Free Form / Skalvouvia - Kentone
DSR-KK7-002 - Sharks - You Made Me Warm / Sharks & Federal Studio Orchestra - You Made Me Warm (Acoustic) - Kentone
DSR-KK7-003 - Eric Monty Morris - Blackman Ska / A Spot In My Heart For You - Kentone
DSR-KK7-004 - Monarchs & Drumbago All Stars - All Of Me / Sneer Towners - You Say Me Say - Kentone
DSR-KK7-005 - Stranger & Patsy (Backed by The Skatalites) - Word Is Wind / Dobby Dobson - Cry Another Cry - Kentone
DSR-FED7-001 - Eddie Perkins - I'm Coming Home / Merritone All Stars - I'm Coming Home (Instrumental) - Merritone
DSR-FED7-002 - The Zodiacs - Walk On By / Merritone Singers - House Upon The Hill - Merritone
DSR-FED7-003 - Lynn Taitt And The Jets - Bat Man / The Joker - Merritone
DSR-FED7-004 - The Renegades - Mr. Hops / Oswald Sewell - Oh My Love - Merritone
DSR-FED7-005 - The Renegades - Big And Fine / Oswald Sewell - Where Can He Go - Merritone
DSR-FED7-006 - Roland Alphonso - How Soon / How Soon Part 2 - Merritone 
DSR-FED7-007 - Henry Buckley - Beware Of All Those Rude Boys / If I Am Right - Merritone
DSR-FED7-008 - Tomorrow's Children - Bang Bang Rock Steady / Rain (Rock Steady) - Merritone 
DSR-FED7-009 - Roland Alphonso - Sai Pan / Black Brothers - Born To Rule - Merritone
DSR-FED7-010 - The Ethiopians - You Got To Be Clean / Miss Nora - Merritone    
DSR-FED7-011 - Don Henry, Lynn Taitt & The Jets - As Long As I Live / Pulus - Sow To Reap - Merritone  
DSR-FED7-012 - Joe Higgs, Lynn Taitt & The Jets - You Hurt My Soul / Lynn Taitt & The Jets - Why Am I Treated So Bad? - Merritone  
DSR-FED7-013 - Hopeton Lewis, Merritone All Stars - Let Me Come On Home / Hardships Of Life - Merritone
DSR-FED7-014 - The Gaylettes, Lynn Taitt & The Jets - Silent River Runs Deep / I Like Your World - Merritone
DSR-FED7-015 - The Tartans -  Real Gone Sweet / It's Not Right - Merritone
DSR-FED7-016 - The Paragons, Lynn Taitt & The Jets - We Were Meant Be / We Were Meant Be (A cappella) - Merritone  
DSR-FED7-017 - The Untouchables - I Do Love You / Mackie Mackie - Merritone  
DSR-FED7-018 - Roland Alphonso - Stranger For Durango / Sounds Of Silence - Merritone
DSR-FED7-019 - The Termites - We Gonna Make It / The Ethiopians - We Gonna Be Free - Merritone
DSR-FED7-020 - Hopeton Lewis - This Music Got Soul / Rocksteady - Merritone
DSR-LJS7-001 - Junior Reid - Puppa Jammy Nice / Little John - Jammys Has Come - King Jammy's Dub
DSR-LJS7-002 - Little John - Jammys Rule / Colin Roach - Hey Yo - King Jammy's Dub
DSR-LJS7-003 - Pad Anthony - Try A Time / Nitty Gritty - Trial And Crosses - Prince Jammy's Dub
DSR-LJS7-004 - Chilites - Jammys Better / Pad Anthony - Caan Make We Run Away - King Jammy's Dub
DSR-LJS7-005 - Nitty Gritty - Play Round The World / Kill Them All - Prince Jammy's Dub
DSR-LJS7-006 - Michael Buckley - Test We / Anthony Malvo & Colin Roach - Jammys Let’s Cruise - King Jammy's Dub
DSR-LJS7-007 - Super Black - A We Rule / Anthony Malvo - Gone Inna History - King Jammy's Dub
DSR-LJS7-008 - Junior Reid - Swinging My Love / Jammys Playing - King Jammy's Dub
DSR-LJS7-009 - Johnny Osbourne - Road Block / Little John - Come Fe Mash It - Prince Jammy's Dub
DSR-LJS7-010 - Thriller U - Raggamuffin Jammys / Earl Sixteen - A One Sound - Prince Jammy's Dub
DSR-KI12-001 - Kiddus I - Jah Power, Jah Glory / Jah Power Version - Shepherd
DSR-KI12-002 - Kiddus I - Graduation In Zion / Graduation In Zion Version - Shepherd
DSR-CD-002 - Various - King Jammys Dancehall 1985-1989 Part 1 (2CD) - Jammys

2012
DSR-KI12-03 - Kiddus I - Fire Burn / Fire Burn Version - Shepherd
DSR-KI12-04 - Kiddus I - Give I Strength / Give I Strength Version - Shepherd
DSR-NL12-003 - Johnny Scar - United Africa  / Dub It In Africa - Solomonic
DSR-FED7-021 - The Tartans - Dance All Night / What Can I Do - Merritone
DSR-FED7-022 - Hopeton Lewis - Cool Collie / This Poor Boy - Merritone
DSR-FED7-023 - The Dynamites - Fountain Bliss / If You Did Love Me - Merritone
DSR-FED7-024 - The Minstrels, Lynn Taitt And The Jets - Hey There Lonely Girl / A cappella version - Merritone
DSR-FED7-025 - Hopeton Lewis - Rocka A Shacka / I Don't Want Trouble - Merritone
DSR-FED7-026 - The Renegades - Knocking On My Door / Hopeton Lewis - Pick Youreself Up - Merritone
DSR-FED7-027 - The Tartans - I'm Ready / Rolling Rolling - Merritone
DSR-FED7-028 - Hopeton Lewis - Don't Cry / A De Pon Dem - Merritone
DSR-FED7-029 - Henry Buckley - Thank You Girl / Take Me Back - Merritone
DSR-FED7-030 - Hopeton Lewis, Lynn Taitt And The Jets - Everybody Rocking / Lynn Taitt And The Jets - Rocking Mood - Merritone
DSR-DH7-001 - Derrick Harriott - Do The Jerk / Derrick Harriott, Paulette - Dance Romeo - Crystal Records
DSR-DH7-002 - Bobby Ellis, Desmond Miles Seven - Step Softly / Derrick Harriott - Walk The Streets - Crystal Records
DSR-DH7-003 - Keith & Tex - Stop That Train / Bobby Ellis, Jets - Feeling Peckish - Move & Groove Records
DSR-DH7-004 - Derrick Harriott - Solomon / Bobby Ellis, Jets - Emperor - Crystal Records 
DSR-DH7-005 - Derrick Harriott - Reach Out I'll Be There / Bobby Ellis, Crystallites - Illya Kuryankin - Crystal Records
DSR-LP-506 - Ernest Ranglin - Mod Mod Ranglin - Federal Records
DSR-FED7-031 - Renegades - You've Lost The Love / Merritone Singers - Rude Boy A Wail - Merritone
DSR-FED7-032 - Henry Buckley - I'd Like To Know / Lynn Taitt, Jets - Soul Shot - Merritone
DSR-FED7-033 - Hopeton Lewis - At The Corner Of The Street / Move Along With Me - Merritone
DSR-FED7-034 - Paragons - Talking Love / If I Were You - Merritone
DSR-FED7-035 - The Tartans - Don't Take That Train / Rockin' Chair - Merritone
DSR-LP-507 - Eric Grant Orchestra - Cool At The Casa Montego'' - Casmo / Federal Records

See also 
 List of record labels

External links
Official Site: Dub Store Records

Japanese independent record labels
Reggae record labels
Reissue record labels